Kimball Peter “Kim” Reynierse (born 10 January 1961) is an Aruban former long-distance runner who competed in the 1992 Summer Olympics.

References

1961 births
Living people
Aruban male long-distance runners
Olympic athletes of Aruba
Athletes (track and field) at the 1992 Summer Olympics
World Athletics Championships athletes for Aruba
Dutch male long-distance runners
Dutch male marathon runners